Polyana is a rural locality (a selo) and the administrative center of Polyansky Selsoviet of Seryshevsky District, Amur Oblast, Russia. The population was 836 as of 2018.

Geography 
Polyana is located 4 km southeast of Seryshevo (the district's administrative centre) by road. Seryshevo is the nearest rural locality.

References 

Rural localities in Seryshevsky District